Hound Dog Man may refer to:

Hound-Dog Man, a 1959 film

The title song, "Hound-Dog Man", from the film by Fabian Forte

"Hound Dog Man", an American song written by Roy Orbison in tribute to Elvis Presley; Orbison performed the song on Austin City Limits
"Hound Dog Man", a song recorded by Lonnie Mack with Stevie Ray Vaughan
"Hound Dog Man", a song recorded by Glenn Campbell